The 2020–21 LBA season was the 99th season of the Lega Basket Serie A (LBA), the men's top tier professional basketball division of the Italian basketball league system. The regular season started on September 26, 2020, and finished on May 2, 2021.

On 11 June, Virtus Segafredo Bologna won its 16th title, defeating 4–0 AX Armani Exchange Milano in the national finals.

Teams

Promotion and relegation (pre-season) 
For he new season, after the first wave of coronavirus pandemic in Italy, the Serie A league decided to bring the number of teams from 17 of the previous season, to 18. Because the 2019–20 season was interrupted without winners and relegated, it was decided that one team from the Serie A2 had to be promoted to the Serie A.

But four teams, Roma, Pistoia, Cremona and U.S. Victoria Libertas Pallacanestro, were going through financial trouble which put at risk their participation to the 2020–21 season. Among them only Pistoia couldn't finalize the subscription and therefore relegated to the Serie A2.

Basket Torino first and then Scaligera Verona were invited to the highest league but they both declined, so that the final number of the teams was set to be 16.

Virtus Roma withdrawal 
In December Virtus Roma had to face an unsustainable financial crisis. Claudio Toti (owner of the team) was looking for an exchange of ownership but no relevant offer was made that could save the team from an inevitable bankruptcy. At the end, on December 9, the final decision was taken and the official withdrawal from the league was submitted to the Italian Basketball Federation. At that moment Roma had played 9 games with only 2 wins and was holding the 15th position in the league table.

All the games from Virtus Roma were voided and the team disappeared from the official website.

Number of teams by region

Venues and locations

Source:

Personnel and sponsorship

Managerial changes

Referees
A total of 38 FIP officials set to work on the 2020-21 season in Lega Basket Serie A:

Notes
 Newly promoted to the Serie A

Changes from 2019 to 2020

Rules 
Each team is allowed either five or seven foreign players under two formulas:
5 foreigners plus #5 Italian or homegrown players
6 foreigners plus #6 Italian or homegrown players

Each club can choose the 5+5 formula, that consists of five Italian players and five foreign players, or the 6+6 formula.

As in previous seasons, LBA clubs must play in arenas that seat at least 3,500 people.

Regular season 
In the regular season, teams play against each other home-and-away in a round-robin format. The matchdays are from September 26, 2020, to May 2, 2021.

League table

Positions by round

Results

Results by round

Statistics 
As of May 10, 2021

Individual statistics

Rating

Points

Rebounds

Assists

Other statistics

Individual game highs 

Source: RealGM

Team statistics 

Notes
  The team with the least turnovers per game

Awards

Playoffs 

The LBA playoffs quarterfinals and semifinals are best of five formats, while the finals series are best of seven format. The playoffs will start in May 2021, to finish in June 2021, depending on result.

Serie A clubs in European competitions

See also 

 2021 Italian Basketball Cup
 2020 Italian Basketball Supercup

References

External links 
 Lega Basket website 

Lega Basket Serie A seasons
Italian
2020–21 in Italian basketball